The Armchair is a 2009 Burkinabé film directed by Missa Hebié. It was written by Hebié and Noraogo Sawadogo. It won the Oumarou Ganda Prize at the 21st Panafrican Film and Television Festival of Ouagadougou. It was also screened at the 2009 Pusan International Film Festival in South Korea.

Cast
 Barthélémy Bouda
 Norah Kafando
 Justin Oindida
 Barou O. Ouédraogo

References

External links
 
 AllAfrica article 

2009 films
2000s French-language films
Burkinabé drama films